Lucia Bosè (28 January 1931 – 23 March 2020) was an Italian actress.

Life and career 
Lucia Bosè was born in Milan to Francesca Borloni and Domenico Bosè. After a number of years working in a bakery, Pasticceria Galli, in her native city, in 1947 she won the second edition of the Miss Italia beauty contest.

Later, she acted in Dino Risi’s short The Five Days of Milan, then in 1950, she made her big-screen debut in Giuseppe De Santis’ Non c'è pace tra gli ulivi (No Peace Under the Olive Tree). The same year, she gave a performance as Paola Molon in Antonioni's Cronaca di un amore. In 1953, Michelangelo Antonioni asked her to play "Clara Manni" in La signora senza camelie and Juan Antonio Bardem cast her in the lead of Muerte de un ciclista (1955). She also appeared in the 1955 film Gli Sbandati and played the main female role in Luis Buñuel's Cela s'appelle l'aurore (1956).

Her career flourished until 1955 when she fell in love with Spanish bullfighter Luis Miguel Dominguín during the filming of Muerte de un ciclista, and gave up acting to marry and raise a family. The couple married twice, first on 1 March 1955 in Las Vegas and then on 19 October of that year, in a Catholic ceremony at the family estate or finca.

Dominguín returned to the bullfighting arena abroad, and their first child, Miguel Bosé, was born in Panama on 3 April 1956. Their second child, Lucia, was born in 1957 and their third, Paola, was born in 1960. Lucia and her husband were married until 1968, but their differences were accentuated over time, especially her lack of interest in bullfighting. She never became close to the "Dominguín" clan, and his marital infidelities also took their toll.

In 1960, she took a small uncredited role in Jean Cocteau's film Le testament d'Orphée, ou ne me demandez pas pourquoi!. Then, after divorcing Dominguin, she returned full-time to the screen, appearing in Fellini's Fellini Satyricon (1969) and starring in the Taviani Brothers' Under the Sign of Scorpio (1969), Mario Colucci's Something Creeping in The Dark (1971), Liliana Cavani's L'ospite (1972), Giulio Questi's Arcana (1972), Marguerite Duras' Nathalie Granger (1972), Beni Montresor's La messe dorée (1975), Jeanne Moreau's Lumière (1976) and Daniel Schmid's Violanta (1976). She continued to be active in both Italian and Spanish films, appearing in Francesco Rosi's Cronaca di una morte annunciata (1987), Agustí Villaronga's El niño de la luna (1989), Ferzan Özpetek's Harem Suare (1999) and Roberto Faenza's I Viceré (2007).

Death 

Bosè died at the General Hospital of Segovia on 23 March 2020, at the age of 89, from pneumonia during the COVID-19 pandemic.

Partial filmography 

 No Peace Under the Olive Tree (1950) – Lucia Silvestri
 Story of a Love Affair (1950) – Paola Molon Fontana
 It's Love That's Ruining Me (1951) – Clara Montesi
 Paris Is Always Paris (1951) – Mimi de Angelis
 Three Girls from Rome (1952) – Marisa Benvenuti
 Rome 11:00 (1952) – Simona
 The Temptress (1952)
 The Lady Without Camelias (1953) – Clara Manni
 It Was She Who Wanted It! (1953) – Nausicaa Invernaghi
 Of Life and Love (1954) – Angela Reis (segment "Marsina stretta")
 Concert of Intrigue (1954) – Elisabeth Tatabor
 It Happened at the Police Station (1954) – Stefania Rocca, wife of Luigi
 Magic Village (1955) – Thérèse Miceli
 Death of a Cyclist (1955) – María José de Castro
 Abandoned (1955) – Lucia
 Symphony of Love (1956) – Teresa Grob
 Cela s'appelle l'aurore (1956) – Clara
 Testament of Orpheus (1960) – Une amie d'Orphée / Orphée's Friend (uncredited)
 No somos de piedra (1968) – Monja
 Nocturne 29 (1968)
 Under the Sign of Scorpio (1969) – Glaia
 Fellini Satyricon (1969) – La matrona
 Love and Other Solitudes (1969) – María
 The Picasso Summer (1969) – Woman (uncredited)
 Jutrzenka (1969) – George Sand
 Metello (1970) – Viola
 So Long Gulliver (1970) – Evelyne
 Something Creeping in The Dark (1971) – Sylvia Forrest
 The Double (1971) – Nora Tosatti
 L'ospite (1971) – Anna / Mélisande / Geneviève
 The House of the Doves (1972) – Alexandra / Mother
 Arcana (1972) – Mamma
 Nathalie Granger (1972) – Isabelle
 La colonna infame (1972) – Chiara Mora – la moglie di Giacomo
 The Heroes (1973) – (uncredited)
 Ceremonia sangrienta (1973) – Erzebeth Bathory
 Manchas de sangre en un coche nuevo (1975) – Eva
 La messe dorée (1975) – Hélène
 Down the Ancient Stairs (1975) – Francesca
 Lumière (1976) – Laura
 Los viajes escolares (1976) – Avelina
 Violanta (1977) – Donna Violanta
 Chronicle of a Death Foretold (1987) – Placida Linero
 Brumal (1988) – Madre de Adriana
 Moon Child (1989) – Directora
 Volevo i pantaloni (1990) – Grazia
 The Miser (1990) – Dona Elvira
 Harem Suare (1999) – Old Safiye
 I Viceré (2007) – Donna Ferdinanda
 One More Time (2013) – Lucia (final film role)

References

External links 

 

1931 births
2020 deaths
Italian film actresses
Actresses from Milan
20th-century Italian actresses
21st-century Italian actresses
Italian beauty pageant winners
Deaths from the COVID-19 pandemic in Spain
Deaths from pneumonia in Spain